Bering may refer to:
 Vitus Bering (1681–1741), Danish-born navigator in the service of the Russian Navy
 Maritime features of Alaska/Siberia region:
 Bering Sea, body of water in the North Pacific Ocean
 Bering Strait, sea strait between Russia and Alaska
 Bering Island, off Kamchatka Peninsula in Bering Sea
 Bering land bridge, Pleistocene-ice-ages route between continents
 Bering (surname)
 Bering (horse), Thoroughbred racer
 Bering, East Sikkim, small village in East Sikkim, India
 Bering Truck, former American truck manufacturer and distributor

See also
 Baring (disambiguation)
 Bearing (disambiguation)
 Behring (disambiguation)